Nicolás Emanuel "Uvita" Fernández (born 8 February 1996), is an Argentine professional footballer who plays as a forward for Defensa y Justicia.

Personal life
Fernández has four footballing brothers: Brian Fernández, Leandro Fernández, Juan Cruz Villagra and Tomás Villagra; the latter two took their mother's surname.

References

External links

1996 births
Living people
Argentine footballers
Association football forwards
Defensa y Justicia footballers
San Lorenzo de Almagro footballers
Argentine Primera División players
Fernández/Villagra family
Footballers from Santa Fe, Argentina